Spongiimicrobium is a Gram-negative, strictly aerobic, rod-shaped and chemoheterotrophic genus of bacteria from the family of Flavobacteriaceae with one known species (Spongiimicrobium salis). Spongiimicrobium salis has been isolated from a marine sponge from Japan.

References

Flavobacteria
Bacteria genera
Monotypic bacteria genera
Taxa described in 2016